Wayne Holmes (born July 29, 1950) is an American wrestler. He competed in the men's Greco-Roman 48 kg at the 1972 Summer Olympics.

References

External links
 

1950 births
Living people
American male sport wrestlers
Olympic wrestlers of the United States
Wrestlers at the 1972 Summer Olympics
Sportspeople from Columbus, Ohio